The Parliamentary committees are established to study and deal with various matters that cannot be directly handled by the legislature due to their volume. They also monitor the functioning of the executive branch.

The Parliamentary committees are of two kinds – standing or permanent committees and ad hoc committees. The former are elected or appointed periodically and they work on a continuous basis. The latter are created on an ad hoc basis as the need arises and they are dissolved after they complete the task assigned to them.

Standing committees
A standing committee is a committee consisting of Members of Parliament. It is a permanent and regular committee which is constituted from time to time according to the provisions of an Act of Parliament or Rules of Procedure and Conduct of Business. The work done by the Indian Parliament is not only voluminous but also of a complex nature, hence a good deal of its work is carried out in these Parliamentary committees.

Standing committees are of the following kinds :

 Financial standing committees (FSC)
 Department related standing committees (DRSC)
 Other standing committees (OSC)

Financial standing committees 
There are three important standing committees dealing with financial affairs. These committees involve further sub-committees.

 Public Accounts Committee – It examines various expenditure reports and accounts under the purview of the Parliament. Till 1921, a senior member of the ruling party used to be appointed by the Speaker as Chairman of the Committee. In 1921, under the provision of the government of India act of 1919 and has since  been in existence. However, for the first time, a member from the Opposition in Lok Sabha, was appointed as the chairperson of the committee by the Speaker of the Lok Sabha. This practice continues till date. 
Estimates Committee – The committee on Estimates, constituted for the first time in 1950, is a committee consisting of 30 members, elected every year by the Lok Sabha from amongst its Members.
Public Undertakings Committee – It analyses the accounts, and workings of the state owned PSU firms. It also keeps a check on the disinvestment policies of the various PSUs.

Department-related standing committees 

During the year 1989 – 8th Lok Sabha the Rules Committee considered and approved a proposal that three subject committees, on (i) Agriculture; (ii) Environment & Forests; and (iii) Science & Technology. related to these committees were finally approved by the House and the committees were formally constituted with effect from 18 August 1989.

The Reports of Rules Committees of the 10th Lok Sabha and Rajya Sabha adopted by the two Houses on 29 March 1993 paved the way for the setting up of the 17 departmentally related standing committees covering under their jurisdiction all the Ministries/Departments of the Union Government.

These DRSCs replaced the earlier three subject committees constituted in August, 1989. The 17 departmentally related standing committees were formally constituted with effect from April, 1993. After experiencing the working of the DRSC system for over a decade, the system was re-structured in July, 2004 wherein the number of DRSCs was increased from 17 to 24. Till 13th Lok Sabha, each of these standing committees used to consist of 45 members— 30 nominated by the Speaker from amongst the members of Lok Sabha and 15 members nominated by the Chairman, Rajya Sabha from amongst the members of Rajya Sabha. However, with re-structuring of DRSCs in July, 2004 each DRSC consists of 31 members—21 from Lok Sabha and 10 from Rajya Sabha.

There are 24 department-related standing committees (DRSCs). Each of these committees have 31 members – 21 from Lok Sabha and 10 from Rajya Sabha. These members are to be nominated by the Speaker of Lok Sabha or the Chairman of Rajya Sabha respectively. The term of office of these committees does not exceed one year. These committees are serviced either by Lok Sabha secretariat or the Rajya Sabha secretariat, depending on who has appointed the chairman of that committee.

Other standing committees 

** In each House there is a GPC. All members are ex-officio members by virtue of being chairmen of respective standing committees and leaders of respective parties.

Ad hoc committees
, the following ad hoc committees are in operation:

Notable ad hoc committees
The Government of India has appointed a number of committees ad-hoc committees. Some of the notable ad-hoc committees are as follows :

Pre-independence

After Independence

See also
 Standing committees of India
 List of Indian commissions

References

Committees of the Parliament of India
 
Committees
Legislatures-related lists